Elections to Chelmsford Borough Council were held in 2011 alongside local elections in other parts of the United Kingdom.

Ward results

Bicknacre and East & West Hanningfield

Boreham and The Leighs

Broomfield and The Walthams

Chelmer Village and Beaulieu Park

Chelmsford Rural West

Galleywood

Goat Hill

Great Baddow East

Great Baddow West

The Lawns

Little Baddow, Danbury and Sandon

Marconi

Moulsham and Central

Moulsham Lodge

Patching Hall

Rettendon and Runwell

St. Andrew's

South Hanningfield, Stock and Margaretting

South Woodham - Chetwood and Collingwood

South Woodham - Elmwood and Woodville

Springfield North

Trinity

Waterhouse Farm

Writtle

 
 
 
 
 
 
 
 

2011 English local elections
2011